Superboy (also known as Kon-El or Conner Kent) is a superhero appearing in American comic books published by DC Comics. A modern variation on the original Superboy, the character first appeared as Superboy in The Adventures of Superman #500 (June 1993), and was created by writer Karl Kesel and artist Tom Grummett.

From the character's debut in 1993 to August 2003, Superboy was depicted as a genetically-engineered metahuman clone of human origin designed by Project Cadmus as a duplicate and closest genetic equivalent of Superman. The character was retconned in Teen Titans (vol. 3) #1 (September 2003) as a human/Kryptonian binary clone made from the DNA of Superman and Lex Luthor. This has since become the character's most enduring origin story in later comic books and media adaptations.

Conner made his live adaptation debut in the final season of Smallville, played by Lucas Grabeel, and appears as a regular starting in the second season in the DC Universe and HBO Max series Titans, played by Joshua Orpin.

Publication history
Kon-El is depicted as a modern incarnation of the original Superboy. Created by writer Karl Kesel and artist Tom Grummett, the character first appeared in The Adventures of Superman #500 (June 1993).

Fictional character biography

Origin
After the death of Superman at the hands of a Kryptonian monster named Doomsday, Project Cadmus Executive Director Paul Westfield wanted to create a clone replacement of Superman to safeguard people. After failed attempts to acquire Superman's DNA (which included an attempt to steal his corpse), Westfield decided to genetically alter a human clone to look like Superman and made the clone to be the closest human equivalent to a Kryptonian as they could based on their research. During their research when they had Superman's body, Westfield's scientists discovered a bio-electric aura surrounding Superman's body that provided some of Superman's powers such as invulnerability, flight through a form of self-telekinesis, protection from getting dirty and protection from skin-tight clothing to be damaged. The aura was translated into a telekinetic field for a human that would give the clone the ability to simulate Superman's powers such as flight, invulnerability, and strength. This was later known as "tactile telekinesis" by the scientists. After twelve failed attempts, the clone known as Experiment 13 was grown from a single cell to a teenage boy in less than a week and was a complete success. The clone was given implanted memories and underwent an artificial maturation process intended to match the age of the original Superman. This clone was released from his cloning tube too early, however, and emerged as a teenager. While at first calling himself "Superman", he would later be known as Superboy.

The Metropolis Kid
When Superboy arrived in Metropolis, he used the name "Superman". While glibly asserting he was Superman, he quickly rebuked any insinuation he was the original Superman. In fact, he told anyone who'd listen that he was a clone of Superman. This revelation was first revealed to Lois Lane, but she was not interested. This prompts the Kid to turn to another reporter, Tana Moon, who breaks the story live on WGBS. Three other Supermen emerged simultaneously: "The Man of Tomorrow" (Cyborg Superman), "The Last Son of Krypton" (Eradicator), and "The Man of Steel" (Steel). After the original Superman's return, Superboy began operating alongside him as an independent hero for a time, refusing to give credence to the idea that he was a "sidekick" of Superman's.

The Hero of Hawaii
After a few weeks of travelling, Superboy and Dubbilex arrived in Hawaii, joined by Rex and Roxy Leech. After a running battle with Sidearm on the beach, Superboy learned that Tana Moon had moved to Hawaii. Superboy decided to stay on the islands, stylizing himself as the "Hero of Hawaii."

He rejoined Cadmus and began working as a field agent with Dubbilex and Guardian. After a mission in Paris where they battled the Agenda and meet a supermodel named "Hex", who claims to be Jonah Hex, Superboy meets the new Cadmus Director (Mickey "the Mechanic" Cannon), new military liaison Col. Adam Winterbourne (one of the men the Kid rescued from the Wild Lands), and one of the new ace scientists, Serling Roquette. Superboy is interested in Serling (as she's one of the few women at the Project and the only one close to his own age), but she is oblivious at first.

During this period, Superboy teams up with Static and Rocket to combat the cosmic being known as the Rift. He also was the first superhero to face King Shark and Knockout.

Kon-El, Young Justice (1998–2003)
A defining moment in Superboy's life would come when Superman asks Superboy to come with him to the Fortress of Solitude. While there, Superboy visits Krypton via virtual reality and experienced the life of a Kryptonian soldier who saved the life of Superman's ancestor, Captain Van-L, during a battle against the terrorist group Black Zero. Superboy later experiences the life of Kon-El, a descendant of the same Kryptonian soldier and a member of the second House of El established by his predecessor. After the simulation and Superman asking Superboy to look out of questionable cloning practices by Cadmus, Superman tells Superboy that he considered Superboy family and bestows upon him the Kryptonian name of Kon-El in honor of Superman's cousin in spirit. Superboy tearfully accepts, overjoyed with the simple joy of having a real name. After Cadmus was shut down, Superboy had no job and no place to stay. He relocates to Metropolis, becoming the "super" at a tenement building called Calvin Gardens. Eventually Superman invites him to stay with his parents in Smallville, which he gladly accepted and did for quite some time.

Superboy is a founding member of Young Justice, a group of teenage heroes who intended to one day be the next Justice League.

Superboy first encountered his future teammate Robin after the latter called Rex Leech requesting Superboy's help in defeating Metallo in Gotham City while Superboy was judging the first "Miss Kryptonite" pageant in Hawaii. While Superboy and Robin seemingly defeated Metallo, Poison Ivy takes control of Superboy. Robin follows Superboy and Poison Ivy to Kauai, where Poison Ivy released vines all over the island. Metallo shows up in Kauai as well and the team of Superboy and Robin defeated them. It was during this that Superboy discovered that he had a weakness to Kryptonite radiation that made him sick in the presence of it as guessed by Professor Hamilton. He also teamed up with future Young Justice member Captain Marvel Jr. against mental projections of Knockout, Chain Lightning, Captain Nazi, Silversword, Superman, and Captain Marvel.

Although Young Justice's first mission was technically the rescuing of the metahuman ghost-girl, Secret, the group did not officially form until an incident in which the world's adult population was kidnapped and transfers them to a copy Earth, by a pre-teen with godlike powers. Teaming up with Robin and Impulse, the three teen heroes manage to defeat Bedlam and return everything to normal. Soon after, they agreed to form an official team, dubbed "Young Justice" by the media. Soon after they are joined by Secret, Arrowette, Wonder Girl, and others. Although Superboy and Robin begin with an argumentative relationship similar to the one shared by Superman & Batman as well as leadership struggles, they became allies and best friends. Superboy and Wonder Girl's relationship is developed throughout Young Justice. At first, Wonder Girl's infatuation with Superboy is unnoticed. In the final issue of Young Justice, both Wonder Girl and Superboy reveal they have feelings for each other. After the events of Titans/Young Justice: Graduation Day and the apparent death of Donna Troy, Young Justice disbands with Superboy, Robin, Impulse, and Wonder Girl going their own separate ways.

Teen Titans (2003–2005)

Now based in Smallville with a new civilian identity as Clark Kent's cousin "Conner Kent", Superboy is asked by Superman to accept Cyborg's invitation to join a new incarnation of the Teen Titans with his former Young Justice teammates Robin, Impulse, and Wonder Girl. Also on the team are Teen Titans veterans Cyborg, Starfire, and Beast Boy. Superboy is retconned from the original premise of a human clone of Paul Westfield with restructured DNA (based on a genetic template from Roxy Leech) to a hybrid of Superman's Kryptonian DNA and Paul Westfield's human DNA making him a binary clone. After the new team gathers at Titans Tower in San Francisco Bay, it is revealed via an email sent to Robin that Superboy's human DNA is not from Paul Westfield but from Superman's archenemy Lex Luthor.

During Superboy's first adventures with the Teen Titans, his Kryptonian powers start to manifest. In a battle with Jericho, Superboy's body gets possessed by him and Jericho was able to exhibit heat vision and other Superman-like powers. At first Superboy seems to have a hard time controlling his powers but he soon adjusts. Later, during Wonder Girl and Conner's first date, Superboy is forcibly sucked through a time portal to the 31st century.

When Superboy reappears, he is wearing the classic Superboy outfit (with a Legion belt buckle). It's revealed that he was mistaken for Clark Kent and taken to the 31st century, where he was dumped once his true identity was realized, he then fought alongside the Legion of Super-Heroes for the remainder of his time there. After enlisting other Titans to join him alongside the Legion to combat a new threat, the team attempts to return to the present. On the return trip home, they accidentally arrive ten years in the future instead of the present. The Teen Titans meet adult versions of themselves. Superboy finds that he is now Superman, Tim is Batman, Cassie is Wonder Woman, and Bart is the Flash. In this alternate future, Conner has greater control of his powers, Cassie chooses him over Captain Marvel Jr., Lex Luthor is his mentor/father figure, and the Titans are "freakin' bad guys". They discuss the possibility of breaking up the team when they get back to the present, but Cyborg 2.0 tells them that the future developed the way it did because the team was not together during the "Crisis".

After encountering dark reflections of themselves from a possible future, the Titans make it back to the present to contemplate what they've just seen. Not long afterward, Lex Luthor is able to co-opt Conner to reach his "full potential," which results in a brutal, mind-controlled attack by Superboy that levels the Titans. His mind is eventually restored, and he is horrified at what he's done to his team and friends. Afterwards, Conner takes a leave of absence from the Titans and secludes himself in the Kents' home. He is unsure as to whether or not, being a clone, he even has a soul. There, Raven shows him that he had a young soul that was stronger than his inner demons and steadily growing.

Infinite Crisis, death and return (2005–2011)
In the DC Comics' limited series Infinite Crisis, the other-dimensional Superboy-Prime watches Conner during his seclusion in the paradise dimension. Along with Alexander Luthor Jr., another survivor of the previous Crisis, they wish to reconstruct the DC Universe in their image after determining that the heroes they've been observing didn't meet their own standards of what heroism really was. Resentful of Conner, whom he claims has lower standards than his own despite a seemingly perfect life, Superboy-Prime attacks him, telling him that he should be his replacement as Superboy. Possessing an apparent strength advantage, Superboy-Prime pulverizes Conner, badly injuring him, until the Teen Titans, Doom Patrol, and Justice Society of America join the fray, leading to a climactic battle where various Flashes pull Superboy-Prime into the Speed Force.

After another encounter in which Superboy-Prime decimates a team of heroes attempting to stop him, Conner clashes with Prime once more, sending both of them headlong into Alexander Luthor's multiverse tower. Conner, fatally injured from the explosion, lies dying in the arms of Wonder Girl. When Cassie tells him that he had saved the Earth, Conner replies, "I know, Cass. Isn't it cool?" Moments later, he dies. Batman, Wonder Woman, Kal-El, Nightwing, and Kal-L arrive, too late to save Conner's life. Later, Superman mourns Conner's death while cradling his body. Conner is buried under his civilian name in Metropolis, alongside the bodies of Kal-L (the Earth-Two Superman) and his wife Lois Lane Kent, for over a year.

Aftermath and resurrection
In year-long weekly series 52, which directly follows on from Infinite Crisis, although Conner is dead, he is not forgotten. Wonder Girl leads a memorial broadcast over the Internet, and she and hundreds of others pay their final respects to Conner in a traditional Kryptonian way. It is revealed that the mourners are part of a resurrection cult supposedly based on Kryptonian theology, which Wonder Girl and Ralph Dibny refer to as the "Cult of Conner".

In Week 51, Batman and Robin return from their journey across the globe. When the heroes appear at Superboy's memorial on the first anniversary of his death, Robin is wearing a new costume using colors of black and red from Superboy's last uniform. Wonder Girl also changes her costume to honor Superboy as well, wearing a Golden Age Wonder Woman-themed T-shirt and denim jeans. Superboy memorial statues are erected in Metropolis next to Superman's statue and in San Francisco outside of Titans Tower. One year later, Lex Luthor still mourns Conner's death as he considers him his own son.

The character is later revived in the pages of Final Crisis: Legion of Three Worlds (2008–09). Having been placed in a Kryptonian healing chrysalis 1000 years ago by Starman (Thom Kallor) of the Legion of Super-Heroes, Kon-El awakens in the 31st century to once again battle Superboy-Prime. After Superboy-Prime is retconned by himself, Superboy and Kid Flash (Bart Allen), who has also been resurrected, Bart and Kon are returned to the 21st century to resume their lives. Superboy briefly featured as the main character in a revival of Adventure Comics, one of DC's oldest Superman books. During the Blackest Night storyline, Conner was briefly turned into a member of the Black Lantern Corps, but Wonder Girl manages to free him by using the temporally-complex nature of his resurrection against his Black Lantern self, luring him to the Fortress so that the ring can be drawn off him by the presence of his deceased self, allowing Conner to destroy the ring before it can take control of either of him.

Following the conclusion of War of the Supermen, writer Jeff Lemire and artist Pier Gallo launched a new Superboy series. The series depicted Conner attempting to resettle his life in Smallville, and it ran until September 2011.

The New 52 (2011)

In September 2011, The New 52 rebooted DC's continuity. In this new timeline, Superboy is introduced with an entirely different origin story. He first appears in Teen Titans (vol. 4) #1, where he is the half-human half-Kryptonian clone creation of the mysterious organization N.O.W.H.E.R.E., which seeks to control the new generation of metahumans.

In the Superman/Supergirl/Superboy crossover storyline "H'El on Earth", he is attacked by a time traveling Kryptonian named H'El for being a clone, after which H'El delivers his body to Supergirl and Superman for execution. As clones were generally hated by Kryptonians, H'El believes this act will prove his loyalty to Krypton, but it instead triggers conflict between him and Superman, who doesn't wish to kill Kon-El. During the fight against H'El, Superboy and Superman come to know each other better and develop a feeling of friendship and understanding. Kon-El is surprised by Superman's heroism and is touched by it.

Following the "Forever Evil" Justice League storyline, the evil speedster Johnny Quick throws the Teen Titans forward in time. After he is separated from the Titans, Kon-El encounters Jon Lane Kent, the villainous future son of Superman and Lois Lane. Kon-El is actually a clone of Jon Lane Kent, created by Harvest (founder of N.O.W.H.E.R.E.) so that a cure could be found for Jon's illness. During their battle, Jon Lane Kent is seriously injured, but then Kon-El falls through a portal and is transported to Krypton's Argo City in the past, days prior to planet's destruction. This leads to the 2013 Return to Krypton storyline. During the story, Kon-El uses the last of his powers to lift Argo City off of the dying Krypton, saving it so that a young Supergirl can arrive on Earth just as history records. He then dies with the planet, accepting himself as more than a "living weapon", in Superman (vol. 3) #25.

Meanwhile, in Teen Titans, the unconscious and injured Jon Lane Kent is recovered by the Beast Boy and Rose Wilson of the future timeline. Despite being Jon Lane Kent, the future Beast Boy and Rose Wilson hide this and dress him in Kon-El's costume for their own purposes. The present day Teen Titans find Jon Lane Kent in Kon-El's costume—unaware of Jon Lane Kent's existence—and take him back to the modern day era where he pretends to be their version of Superboy. The Teen Titans are unaware that Kon-El is "dead" and that they have an impostor in their midst who intends to kill all of Earth's meta-humans, although Superman and Supergirl believe Kon-El is dead and have not told the Titans. It is later revealed that Kon-El is still alive serving a being called the Oracle, patrolling past, present, and future.

Kon-El's consciousness is pulled into a pocket universe (dimension) when Jon Lane Kent touches his Psycho Future Self with all other Kons and Jons of the multiverse. The Future Jon taps into all other Kons and Jons except this dimension's Kon and younger Jon. The younger Jon heroically sacrifices himself to destroy the elder Jon, obliterating them both through his TK, sending all the other Jons and Kons back to their respective timelines, dimensions and universes. Jon isn't erased from history, and his actions outside of the pocket universe are well remembered, but he is truly gone, leaving Kon-El once again as Superboy. Kon-El is later revealed to travel all across the world and train and practice various forms of meditation and inner peace of mind as indicated in Supergirl comics. He later joins the Teen Titans.

DC Rebirth

Following the Convergence event which restored the original pre-Crisis on Infinite Earths (1984) multiverse, and brought back Superman and Lois from before the Flashpoint, the New 52 Conner version of Superboy is not seen or heard from again. Around this time, DC's publishing initiative DC Rebirth initiates a number of stories designed to bring back classic characters and stories from before the unpopular New 52 reboot.

In the DC Rebirth era, the mantle of Superboy is held by Jonathan Samuel "Jon" Kent, the son of Kal-El and Lois Lane. Conner Kent/Superman from the Titans Tomorrow timeline makes an appearance in Detective Comics #966, where he asks Tim Drake/Batman to return to the Titans. Tim is subsequently captured by Mr. Oz, but escapes with the younger present-day Tim Drake. Before sending the younger Tim back to the past, the older Tim asks his younger self to reconcile his friendship with Conner. The young Tim Drake responds that he doesn't know who Conner is, leading the older Tim to realize that time has been altered. Tim later mentioned that although he didn't know why, he felt Conner's name "tugging at my heart". The New 52 Kon-El is also lightly referenced in Red Hood and the Outlaws when the Outlaws and the Suicide Squad explore a N.O.W.H.E.R.E. facility and Bizarro (whose brain chemistry was enhanced making him smarter) had Deadshot and Captain Boomerang accompany him to shut down the facility's main generator as he was aware that since it was designed to be protected against Kryptonians due to another clone (with Harvest and Kon-El seen in a flashback) and Bizarro knew he would die if he attempted to shut it down by himself. Later in "Superman Reborn", the histories of the pre-Flashpoint and New 52 Supermen are merged. When the post-Rebirth Superman reviews his own life story, Kon-El is not mentioned as one of the “replacements” who arose following Superman's death at the hands of Doomsday.

The Titans of Tomorrow version of Conner later appeared in the "Super-Sons of Tomorrow" crossover where he along with his universe's version of Wonder Woman and Flash travel back to the past to prevent their unhinged teammate Tim Drake (Batman) from killing Jon Kent. He would later help stop Jon's Solar Flare power from going out of control. Before they return to their time, Conner chooses not to disclose any information to Superman to prevent it from affecting the future.

Wonder Comics
In Young Justice (vol. 3) #1, it is revealed that Conner was a survivor of the continuity of the New Earth when Impulse runs into him while stranded in Gemworld. Conner, who was teleported to Gemworld during a confrontation with S.T.A.R Laboratories, did not experience the "rebooting" of his home dimension due to being outside of it while it occurred. As a result, most inhabitants of his dimension do not remember him. During his time on Gemworld, he befriended a young widower and pretended to be her farmer husband to protect her family from soldiers, and awaited help from his dimension. Eventually, Young Justice retrieves Conner, and he returns to his Earth after a series of incidents that result in the group dimension-hopping.

Action Comics 
Upon returning, Conner reacquaints himself with Superman, who does not recognize him and is perplexed by his existence. Superman takes Conner to be examined by members of the Justice League, who warn him that his powers may eventually disappear in his lifetime. After aiding Superman and his family against Leviathan operatives in Metropolis, Conner decides to remain at the Kent family farm in Smallville as the elderly Kents and Krypto receive him warmly and are mysteriously able to recall memories of him.

In the Infinite Frontier era, Superboy appears as a main character in the books Suicide Squad and Titans United, as well as guest appearance in Teen Titans Academy, where various characters opine something is wrong with him and his powers appear to be malfunctioning. He appears in his 2000s-era T-shirt costume. The Superboy forced to work for Amanda Waller as part of her Suicide Squad was later revealed, unknowingly, to be Match, Conner's defective clone, when the real Superboy (dressed more in his 1990s look) confronts him.

Powers, abilities, and equipment

Tactile telekinesis
Originally, Superboy's only superpower is a telekinetic force field that surrounds his body and granted him abilities that approximated some of Superman's powers such as super strength, flight and invulnerability. The field allowed Superboy to lift heavy objects by extending the field around him and deflecting any solid object that came into contact with him. The field also allowed Superboy the ability to manipulate objects that he came into tactile contact with, bend them into any shape that he could visualize mentally, and disassemble things such as machines and other complex constructions by touch. Under Knockout's training, Superboy learned new ways to use his tactile telekinesis such as projecting telekinetic force waves to blast pieces of ground and extending his field to another person. Superboy can also manipulate solid masses such as volumes of sand or dust, causing the individual particles to fly apart in an explosive manner to create particle clouds or a forceful attack. He can also perform the same with solid masses that are splintered, such as a cracked slab of concrete or fractured pane of glass. The telekinetic field also lets Superboy break free of an opponent's grip by pushing the field outward to force the opponent away and he is also able to create an air pocket around himself, enabling him to breathe in outer space. In addition, he demonstrated the ability to extend his telekinetic field around other people that he touches to make them invulnerable. He also learned a trick from his older and more experienced alternate self, Black Zero, that allowed him to freeze people where they stood if he was touching the same surface that they were standing on.

The main disadvantage of Superboy's tactile-telekinetic ability is that while his field could withstand physical force, the field is less effective in blocking radiant or conductive energy such as fire and laser fire. This left Superboy slightly more susceptible to energy-based attacks. While less effective against gaseous materials, he could manipulate water with a degree of difficulty and project his tactile telekinesis to create a current he could fire while underwater. He can also use his telekinetic field to deflect lava and prevent himself from being burned. Although Superboy was vulnerable to Kryptonite and magic, he was immune to the effects of a creature called "The Four-Armed Terror" which Superman was highly allergic to. Another advantage of Superboy's telekinesis is that it does not use up his solar energy as fast as Superman's powers. In "The Final Night", the Earth's sun was being eaten by a Sun-Eater which severely weakened Superman but Superboy's power level remained the same and he was able to use his tactile telekinesis at normal strength.

The process that made Superboy's human physiology genetically similar to that of a Kryptonian was done in such detail that he was a living solar battery like Superman, had a weakness to Kryptonite radiation that made him physically ill, and it was theorized that there was a possibility for him to gain superpowers that did not derive from tactile telekinesis when he matured like Superman or if Superboy was aged to full adulthood as planned by Project Cadmus. As explained by his alternate timeline counterpart Black Zero and shown when Superboy himself was aged to an adult by Klarion, Superboy gained new powers such as heat vision and super hearing when he matured to full age as well as gaining a higher form of increased telekinesis, strength, and greater invulnerability.

In the New 52, it seems that Superboy has not yet obtained all of his Kryptonian powers and his only abilities are his tactile telekinesis and a degree of superhuman strength (a weight machine shows he is able to lift in excess of three tons with no strain at all in issue five) as well as a superhuman healing factor (something Harvest pointed out after Superboy's fight with Grunge) and is even able to bend light around him to turn invisible. In this version, it seems that his tactile telekinesis is far more powerful than in previous incarnations. It now operates like regular telekinesis, letting him levitate objects at a distance and also providing greater awareness of his environment, akin to a type of sonar. Superboy's telekinetic abilities also enable him to hyper accelerate himself at amazing speeds. It has become so powerful that when he escaped his test tube, he managed to destroy the entire laboratory and killed everyone inside save for Dr. Caitlin Fairchild. Later, he has shown that his power is so immense that he managed to destroy an entire prison complex while he was unconscious, which led to the belief that he doesn't have complete control over the ability.

It has been revealed that Kon-El is a clone of Jon Lane Kent, Lois and Clark's son from an alternate-timeline future. Jon's hybrid nature led to genetic instability. To solve this problem, Harvest created the clone Superboy as a test and added two extra DNA strands with the human strand from Lois Lane and the Kryptonian strand from Superman. Harvest hoped that Lois and Clark's DNA could counteract the genetic disorder found in Jon's trans-alien DNA. Superboy's creation and stability proved a success. Superboy's telekinetic power stems from Jon Kent's DNA, who also possesses this power due to being a Human/Kryptonian hybrid born under a yellow sun. Kon-El's power was temporarily shown to dwarf Jon's which may be the result of the addition of Lois and Clark's DNA.

When the villainous Kryptonian H'El manages to disrupt his DNA, Superman uses his Kryptonian armor to stabilize Superboy's condition. His tactile telekinesis is condensed, enhancing his physical abilities, but also cutting into his sensory abilities and limiting the range of his power to the point that he has to be in direct contact with an object to mentally affect it. He has since seemingly recovered with his power returned to normal.

Kryptonian powers
During Teen Titans, Superboy developed Kryptonian powers including heat vision, x-ray vision, and super-hearing. He also developed Kryptonian invulnerability. He also has developed Kryptonian level super strength, as shown when he battled the hugely powerful Superboy-Prime and even managed to damage him with some of his blows, when some characters such as Black Adam could not. When the Titans encountered their future selves, he found his future self had greater telekinetic abilities (no longer limited to tactile telekinesis), was stronger, more durable, and faster. Superboy later states that he has developed telescopic vision and eventually figures out how to use his freeze breath. It has also been shown in Teen Titans that he is much faster, traveling from San Francisco to the Arctic in less than an hour whilst carrying Nightwing. Superboy, like Superman, derives his Kryptonian powers from the absorption of solar energy from the Earth's yellow sun, and he is as vulnerable to Kryptonite and magic as is the Man of Steel.

In the Titans Tomorrow story arc, the Kon-El Superman exhibits full Kryptonian abilities and full telekinesis with greater control of his telekinetic fields. In a fight with the future Captain Marvel, he shields himself from a magic attack, an advantage the modern Superman has never had.

A recent issue of Adventure Comics explained that since his return to life he had been trained in the use of heightened mental blocks to defend against mind control and influences, such as the brainwashing Luthor used on him. It was with this training that he was able to briefly pierce the control of the Black Lantern ring, using his heat vision to give Wonder Girl the clue needed to free him from it.

Because both Superboy and Superman as a boy absorbed less solar energy than Superman as an adult, Superboy is also less able to process the appropriate amount of solar energy as fast as Superman could: as a result, overtaxing his powers to the point of physical depletion would spell his death, as his body would literally begin to feed on itself, unable to absorb solar energy fast enough to restore itself.

Other powers
During The New 52, Superboy seemed to possess telepathy, enabling him to sense and detect the thoughts of others. Additionally, he had a high resistance to psionic attacks, allowing him to defend against mind controlling psychics.

Costumes and equipment
 Original costume (1993-2000): In his first appearance, Superboy has a black, blue and red costume with yellow accents and the red and yellow s-shield on his chest, black boots with yellow accents, two black belts with a yellow belt on the right leg, red gloves, fade haircut. The Newsboy Legion gave him a black leather jacket that belonged to a Cadmus worker and when he signed with WGBS, he started wearing black leather jackets with the yellow s-shield on the back along with the addition of black shades and a gold earring to his outfit. He had a red cape that was left behind at Project Cadmus and he later appeared with it when he was changed into an adult during "Sins of Youth". Superboy acquires red "super-goggles" from Professor Hamilton after giving Superboy a cellular diagnostic at S.T.A.R. Labs. The goggles provided him with x-ray vision like Superman but also included other vision powers including heat vision and infrared vision capabilities. The goggles are briefly lost during a mission with the Suicide Squad and then used against Superboy by The Technician, a criminal inventor. After re-acquiring the goggles, Superboy decides to rely on his natural abilities and destroys the goggles rather than risk them falling into the wrong hands again.
 "Superboy: The Last Boy On Earth" (1998): During the "Superboy: The Last Boy On Earth" storyline, his hair is grown past the shoulders with a look similar to the Jack Kirby character Kamandi; blue torn shorts, red boots, red gloves, and a stone necklace with a red and yellow "S" medallion that resembled the S-shield but was the serpentine mark of the slave trader Sacker. He is later given a blue tunic.
 Post "Sins of Youth" (2000): When he was depowered after the "Sins of Youth" storyline, his costume was a black T-shirt with red and yellow S-shield, blue pants, red gloves, red boots, and a yellow utility belt. He used a Legion flight ring to fly and later used a gold wrist guard designed by the Gadget Guru of the Hairies that was powered by the same Legion flight ring. It enabled Superboy to fly and hid a gold S-shield made of an expandable alloy that Superboy used for combat. The S-shield could also be launched from Superboy's wrist guard.
 Updated Costume (2001-2003): In Superboy #83, Superboy is given a redesigned costume. This costume is a blue and dark red outfit with a blue and red jacket of matching design, red gloves, and boots with yellow accents, red shades of advanced design, and a new haircut. This is the character's primary costume until the beginning of Teen Titans in August 2003.
 Teen Titans (2003-2011): The character's design in Teen Titans is a more civilian look featuring jeans and a black T-shirt with a red s-shield. He sports a contemporary short haircut. In the "Superboy and the Legion" storyline from Teen Titans, he wears the classic Superman costume, but with a Legion belt buckle. During the five months he spends in the future, he grows his hair to match Superman.
 The New 52 (2011–2016): In the New 52 relaunch of the DC Universe, Superboy's costume is a black suit created by Project N.O.W.H.E.R.E. with red piping leading into the S-Shield. The origin or functional design within the DC New 52 have yet to be explained but they were likely designed by Harvest. Promotional art for Teen Titans depicted the character wearing a sleeveless black shirt, half-fingered black gloves similar to the original costume, black pants, black boots, and a red barcode tattoo on his right arm.
 Wonder Comics Young Justice (2019–Present): His new costume heavily resembles his original one, except without the goggles and some shoulder spikes and stitched in S-shields on his arm.

Identities
Initially, Superboy is known as "Experiment 13". When he escaped from Cadmus, he used the name "Superman". Those who would not accept him as Superman would refer to him as "The Kid", "Superkid", and "Superboy", a name he hated. After Superman's return, Superman let him use the name "Superboy" and continue to wear the S-shield. During the time, he had no other identity, with Tana Moon calling him "Kid" and Roxy Leech calling him "S.B.". Later, Superman gives him his first real name "Kon-El" (after a descendant of the second House of El and Superman's cousin in spirit). While undercover at Montridge High, Superboy's first attempt at a human alias name is Carl Krummet, a play on the names of Kon-El's creators. The character retains this name after Superboy relocated to Smallville. At the beginning of Teen Titans, he was given another civilian identity by Superman: Conner Kent, cousin to Clark.

During the New 52 era of DC, the origin of the name "Kon-El" was changed. When he was confronted by Supergirl, Kara Zor-El, dubbed him that name upon realizing he was a clone, his new moniker being an insult or slur, having "kon" meaning abomination in the Kryptonian language, and El was added, both mockingly resembling Kryptonian naming conventions and recognizing him as an offense against her family. This version of Kon-El was later removed from continuity and the previous incarnation was restored.

Legal dispute
A March 23, 2006, court decision returned rights to the Superboy character to Jerry Siegel's heirs. The decision, issued six days before Superboy's death in Infinite Crisis #6 hit the shelves, states that the Siegels have owned 'Superboy' since November 17, 2004.

Even though DC Comics does not own the rights to the "Superboy" name, Geoff Johns and Dan DiDio have stated that the decision to kill off the character had nothing to do with the court case, and that they could have just renamed the character. Following the conclusion of Infinite Crisis, Didio compared Superboy's death to Spock's death in Star Trek II: The Wrath of Khan (who was subsequently resurrected), and also stated that he was "as dead as Blue Beetle".

In the Teen Titans Secret Origins, a back-up story in the weekly 52 series, an illustration of Superboy had to be changed to one of Wonder Girl because of the legal dispute.

On the cover of Teen Titans (vol. 3) #46, Match's insignia (a reverse version of Conner's) is obscured, and in Supergirl (vol. 5) #18 (2007), Conner's "S" on his statue is covered. Almost all references to the character refer to him as "Conner".

Recently, it has appeared the legal status has been near dropped, as the Superboy name has been used as normal in several books such as Teen Titans since his return in Final Crisis: Legion of 3 Worlds, with his 'S' shield no longer obscured.

Collected editions

In other media
Television
Live-action

 Superboy appears in the final season of Smallville, portrayed by Jakob Davies as a six-year-old ("Lazarus" and "Isis"), Connor Stanhope as a prepubescent ("Beacon"), and Lucas Grabeel as a teenager ("Beacon", "Scion"). This version is also known as "Alexander Luthor", "LX-15", and a "Cognitional Neuroplastic Replicant" (CNR). After Tess Mercer discovers the six-year-old Alexander in Cadmus Labs, she forms a mother/son bond with him. However, he takes on Lex Luthor's memories and emotions, becomes mentally unstable upon becoming a teenager, and is discovered by Clark Kent. Eventually becoming known as Conner, the clone loses Lex's memories as Clark's powers start to manifest. Lionel Luthor of Earth-2 tries to force him to reject the Clark side of his DNA and embrace his powers via Red Kryptonite, but Conner refuses before vowing to join Clark as a hero when he is ready, enrolling at Smallville High with his help and receiving the Kent surname.
 Conner appears in Titans, portrayed primarily by Joshua Orpin and by body double Brooker Muir in the post-credits scene for the episode "Dick Grayson". This version is also known as Subject 13. After escaping from Cadmus Labs with a genetically modified golden retriever named Krypto, he takes the name "Conner" and experiences Lex Luthor and Superman's memories. After seeking out the former's father Lionel Luthor for answers, Conner is hunted by Lex's personal assistant Mercy Graves before he is rescued by Dr. Eve Watson, who advises him not to publicly use his powers. Despite this, Conner does so to rescue Jason Todd, whom he befriends, joins the Titans, and enters a sexual relationship with Komand'r. Upon founding out that Lex is dying and wants Conner to take over LexCorp, Conner agrees to stay with him, only to be arrested for Lex's apparent murder.

Animation

 Elements of Superboy are incorporated in a clone of Superman nicknamed Kel-El and Superman X appearing in Legion of Super Heroes, voiced by Yuri Lowenthal. This version hails from the 41st century, was created by the artificial intelligence K3NT to oppose Imperiex, and possesses a variety of different powers than Superman, such as an immunity to Kryptonite as it was incorporated into his creation.
 Superboy appears in Young Justice, voiced by Nolan North. This version is the result of Project Cadmus' "Project Kr'''", an attempt at creating a living superweapon meant to replace or destroy Superman, with Lex Luthor's human DNA bridging missing sequences in the Kryptonian DNA to stabilize Conner and inhibit his full powers. While Conner possesses enhanced strength, speed, and hearing, telescopic and infrared vision, and invulnerability, they are weaker than Superman's. Additionally, Conner was telepathically force-fed advanced knowledge in various fields of knowledge while in Cadmus' custody until he is released by Aqualad, Robin, and Kid Flash and forms the Team with them. Throughout the first season, Conner makes attempts to build a relationship with Superman, but the latter refuses to associate with him, much to the former's anger and dismay. He also develops romantic feelings for and later enters a secret relationship with Miss Martian, who coins his alias of Conner Kent. He later learns of his true nature from Luthor, who gives him s-shield patches to temporarily express his full Kryptonian DNA while increasing his aggression, though he eventually comes clean to his teammates. By the season one finale, Conner and Superman reconcile their differences. In season two, Young Justice: Invasion, Conner has grown less aggressive and willing to use strategy and technology on missions, but recently broke up with Miss Martian in between seasons due to her use of excessive violence against those she deems "bad guys" and attempting to manipulate his mind until they eventually reconcile and renew their relationship. In season three, Young Justice: Outsiders, Superboy begins to feel pressure to step up in light of Superman's temporary absence. Conner and Miss Martian have also begun happily living together in Happy Harbor and get engaged. In season four, Young Justice: Phantoms, Conner and Miss Martian travel to Mars to undergo a Martian wedding ceremony with her family until he is seemingly killed after sacrificing himself to stop a gene-bomb. Conner is later revealed to be alive, having been rescued by Phantom Girl, but ended up trapped in the Phantom Zone. He becomes involved in a plot by Lor-Zod to release his parents Dru-Zod and Ursa from the Phantom Zone and the Legion of Super-Heroes's efforts to stop Lor-Zod. By the end of the series, after helping his friends defeat the Zods, Superboy and Miss Martian are reunited and finally get married on Earth surrounded by their family and friends.
 The Young Justice incarnation of Superboy appears in the Teen Titans Go! episode "Let's Get Serious".
 The 1993 comics incarnation of Superboy appears in the 2013 Superman 75th anniversary short produced by Zack Snyder and Bruce Timm.
 Superboy appears in Robot Chicken DC Comics Special 2: Villains in Paradise, voiced by Zac Efron. This version is in a relationship with Lena Luthor.

Film
 Elements of Superboy are incorporated into a clone of Superman who appears in Superman: Doomsday.
 Superboy appears in The Death and Return of Superman, portrayed by Matt Bennett.
 Superboy makes a non-speaking appearance in the mid-credits scene of the DC Animated Movie Universe (DCAMU) film The Death of Superman.
 Superboy appears in the DCAMU film Reign of the Supermen, voiced by Cameron Monaghan. Following the events of The Death of Superman, Superboy is initially and publicly sponsored by Lex Luthor as the "official" Superman before they become disillusioned with each other as Luthor resents Superboy's grandstanding while the latter eventually learns of his true nature. His confidence buoyed by a discussion with Lois Lane, Superboy assists Steel and the Eradicator in reviving Superman before helping him fight Cyborg Superman. Afterwards, Superboy moves in with Jonathan and Martha Kent and takes on the name "Conner".
 Superboy makes a cameo appearance in Teen Titans Go! To the Movies. Superboy makes a non-speaking appearance in the DCAMU film Justice League Dark: Apokolips War. He joins the Teen Titans in defending Earth from Darkseid's Paradooms until one of them kills him.

Video games
 Superboy appears as a playable character in The Death and Return of Superman.
 Superboy appears as a playable character in the Nintendo 3DS, Nintendo DS, and PlayStation Vita versions of Lego Batman 2: DC Super Heroes.
 Superboy appears as a playable character in Young Justice: Legacy, voiced again by Nolan North.
 Superboy appears as a non-playable character (NPC) in DC Universe Online, voiced by Greg Miller.
 Superboy appears as a playable character in Lego Batman 3: Beyond Gotham, voiced by Scott Porter.
 Superboy makes a cameo appearance in Cyborg's ending in Injustice 2. This version was a member of the Teen Titans, most of whom were killed years prior, before Cyborg revives them.
 Superboy appears as a playable character in Lego DC Super Villains, voiced by Yuri Lowenthal.

Miscellaneous
 Superboy appears in the BBC Radio 5 radio drama adaptation of "The Death of Superman", "Funeral For a Friend", and "Reign of the Supermen!" storylines, voiced by Kerry Shale. It was released as "Superman: Doomsday and Beyond" in the United Kingdom by BBC Audiobooks and as "Superman Lives!" in the United States by Time Warner Audiobooks.
 The Smallville incarnation of Superboy appears in Smallville Titans as a member of Jay Garrick's Teen Titans and boyfriend of Miss Martian.
 The Injustice incarnation of Superboy appears in the Injustice: Gods Among Us prequel comics as a member of the Teen Titans who survived the Metropolis disaster. Upon learning Superman killed the Joker in retaliation, Superboy loses faith in the former and attempts to find a Phantom Zone projector, only to be defeated by Superman and sent to the Phantom Zone along with his fellow Titans.
 The Injustice incarnation of Superboy appears in the Injustice 2'' prequel comic. While his fellow Titans are rescued from the Phantom Zone, Superboy opts to stay behind due to his injuries. Following General Zod's death, Batman, Doctor Mid-Nite, and Harley Quinn perform a heart transplant on Superboy using Zod's heart so he can leave the Phantom Zone and reunite with Jonathan and Martha Kent, who give him a Superman-inspired suit in the hopes that he will restore Superman's legacy. Superboy joins Batman's Insurgency in fighting Atrocitus and Starro, but he and Wonder Girl are captured and tortured by Brainiac before he leaves them to die in the vacuum of space, though Booster Gold rescues the pair so they can help the Legion of Super-Heroes.

Reception
The Kon-El incarnation of Superboy has been ranked as the 196th greatest comic book character of all time by Wizard Magazine. IGN also ranked Superboy as the 83rd greatest comic book hero of all time, stating, "This genetic clone of Superman and Lex Luthor often bears the weight of the world on his burly shoulders. But over the years he's managed to carve his own legacy and win a large legion of fans." In 2013, ComicsAlliance ranked Superboy as #35 on their list of the "50 Sexiest Male Characters in Comics".

See also
 Alternative versions of Superman
 Superman character and cast

References

Characters created by Karl Kesel
DC Comics sidekicks
Comics characters introduced in 1993
DC Comics characters who can move at superhuman speeds
DC Comics characters with accelerated healing
DC Comics characters with superhuman senses
DC Comics characters with superhuman strength
DC Comics male superheroes
DC Comics superheroes
DC Comics metahumans
DC Comics hybrids
DC Comics titles
DC Comics martial artists
DC Comics characters who have mental powers
DC Comics telekinetics 
DC Comics child superheroes
Kryptonians
Clone characters in comics
Fictional extraterrestrial–human hybrids in comics
Fictional genetically engineered characters
Fictional characters with absorption or parasitic abilities
Fictional characters with air or wind abilities
Fictional characters with energy-manipulation abilities
Fictional characters with elemental transmutation abilities
Fictional characters with fire or heat abilities
Fictional characters with ice or cold abilities
Fictional characters with nuclear or radiation abilities
Fictional characters with slowed ageing
Fictional characters with superhuman durability or invulnerability
Fictional characters with X-ray vision
Teenage characters in comics
Teenage superheroes
Superboy
Superman characters
Fictional characters displaced in time